The  Philadelphia Eagles season was the franchise's 82nd season in the National Football League and the second under head coach Chip Kelly. The Eagles led the NFC East for most of the year, but when the Dallas Cowboys defeated the Indianapolis Colts in week 16, they were eliminated from playoff contention. 

Quarterback Nick Foles led them to a 6–2 start, despite struggling with turnovers more so than he did in 2013, where he threw only 2 interceptions and lost 1 fumble. Foles was injured in week 9, causing backup Mark Sanchez to take over as starting quarterback. The Eagles then went 4-4 in the last eight games with two losses against their division rivals, the Cowboys and Redskins.

Despite missing the playoffs, they had 9 selections for the 2015 Pro Bowl, second only to the Denver Broncos, who had 11.

Roster changes

Free agents

Signings

Trades
On March 13, the Eagles traded their fifth round selection from the New England Patriots to the New Orleans Saints for running back Darren Sproles.
On May 10, the Eagles traded running back Bryce Brown and a 2014 seventh-round pick (No. 237 overall) to Buffalo for a 2014 seventh-round pick (No. 224 overall) and either a 2015 fourth-round pick or a 2016 third-round pick or a 2016 fourth-round pick.
On August 19, the Eagles Acquired RB Kenjon Barner from the Carolina Panthers in exchange for a conditional seventh-round draft pick in 2015. Barner was later cut and the Panthers would receive no compensation.
On August 20, the Eagles Acquired kicker Cody Parkey from the Indianapolis Colts in exchange for RB David Fluellen. Parkey would later win the starting kicker position.

Roster changes
On March 28, 2014, after what was the statistically best season in his career, the Eagles released wide receiver DeSean Jackson. As a free agent, he signed with the Eagles' division rival, the Washington Redskins, on April 2, 2014. The team made headlines when, on May 5, they signed Alejandro Villanueva, who is an Army Ranger, having served three tours of duty in Afghanistan, and has not played football since 2009.

2014 draft class

Draft trades

Undrafted free agents

Staff

Final roster

Schedule

Preseason

Regular season

Note: Intra-division opponents are in bold text.

Game summaries

Week 1: vs. Jacksonville Jaguars

The Eagles started their season at home against the Jacksonville Jaguars. The Jaguars dominated the first half 17–0 with quarterback Chad Henne throwing two touchdown passes to rookie wide receiver, Allen Hurns. The Jaguars defense forced two fumbles on quarterback Nick Foles
. In the second quarter after a Josh Scobee 49-yard field goal, Foles threw an interception in the end zone to Alan Ball. The ensuing drive led to a Scobee field goal that was blocked by the Eagles.
The Eagles scored on their opening drive in the second half after veteran running back, Darren Sproles rushed 49 yards for a touchdown in his first game as an Eagle. Then, Foles threw a 25-yard touchdown pass to Tight End, Zach Ertz on the next Eagles drive. Then on the first Eagles drive in the fourth quarter, Cody Parkey kicked a 51-yard field goal to tie the game up at 17. Then on the first play of the next Eagles drive, Foles threw a 68-yard touchdown pass to a wide open Jeremy Maclin to give the Eagles the first lead of the game, 24–17. Then, after stopping the Jaguars on fourth down, the Eagles marched down the field which led to a Parkey 28-yard field goal, bringing the lead to 27–17. On the next Jaguars drive, Trent Cole forced Chad Henne to fumble and Fletcher Cox picked it up and returned it for a touchdown. The Eagles won the game 34–17.
With the win, the Eagles were 1–0.

Week 2: at Indianapolis Colts

Week 3: vs. Washington Redskins

This was DeSean Jackson's first game against his former team. The Eagles improved to 3–0 with this win.

Week 4: at San Francisco 49ers

Week 5: vs. St. Louis Rams

Week 6: vs. New York Giants

This marked the first time the Eagles had shut out an opponent since they did so also against the Giants in 1996. Darren Sproles tore his MCL during the game. The Eagles also introduced their blackout uniform in this game.

Week 8: at Arizona Cardinals

Carson Palmer lofted a 75-yard touchdown pass to rookie John Brown with 1:21 to play to give the Arizona Cardinals a stunning 24–20 victory over the Philadelphia Eagles in a matchup of two of the NFL's four remaining one-loss teams.

The Cardinals (6–1) had a goal-line stand that forced the Eagles (5–2) to settle for a 20-yard field goal that put Philadelphia up 20–17 with 1:56 left.
Then on third-and-five, Palmer - who also had an 80-yard TD pass to Larry Fitzgerald - heaved the ball deep, where the speedy Brown gathered it in and crossed the goal line just as he was being tackled.
The Eagles drove to the Arizona 16. On the last play of the game, Jordan Matthews caught a pass from Nick Foles in the end zone but landed out of bounds.

Week 9: at Houston Texans

Mark Sanchez would play for the first time as an Eagle when Nick Foles was injured in the first quarter. Darren Sproles returned from injury.

Week 10: vs. Carolina Panthers

Week 11: at Green Bay Packers

The Packers started hot and never looked back, cruising to an easy win over the Eagles, who were tied for the best record in the NFL.

The Packers took the ball and went 75 yards, with the big play being Aaron Rodgers hooking up with Jordy Nelson for 65 yards. However, two incomplete passes forced the Packers to settle for a 27-yard Mason Crosby field goal. After an Eagles punt, the Packers stormed 88 yards in 13 plays, taking 6:47 off the clock, ending with Rodgers connecting with DaVante Adams for a 6-yard touchdown pass. Rodgers continued to show that the Eagles' secondary was no match. The Eagles went three-and-out on their next drive, but this time Micah Hyde returned the punt 75 yards for a touchdown, extending the Packers lead to 17–0 in the first quarter. The Eagles finally managed points on their next drive, going 44 yards in 10 plays before Cody Parkey hit a 33-yard field goal with 13:08 remaining in the half. Unfortunately, for the Eagles, there was no stopping Aaron Rodgers. The Packers advanced 80 yards in only 6 plays, with Rodgers throwing for 60-yard on the drive, including the 27-yard touchdown pass to Jordy Nelson. The Eagles offense continued to sputter, punting on their next possession. The Packers continued their utter domination, moving to the Eagles 19-yard-line, but Malcolm Jenkins was flagged for pass interference in the end zone, moving the ball to the 1 yard-line. Eddie Lacy took it in on the very next play(the Packers two-point conversion attempt was unsuccessful) and the Packers led 30–3 with just 2:00 minutes left in the half. On their next drive, the Eagles managed to move 65 yards and Cody Parkey hit his second field goal of the half, trimming the score to 30–6 at halftime. The Eagles drove into Packer territory on their first possession of the second half, but Mark Sanchez lost a fumble that was recovered by Nick Perry. The Packers punted for the first time all night on their next drive, but the Eagles did nothing, punting themselves. The Packers proceeded to march 48 yards and Crosby was successful from 33 yards away, giving the Packers a 33–6 lead. On the following drive Mark Sanchez continued to give up the ball, with defensive end Julius Peppers returning an interception 52 yards for a touchdown making the score 39-6(Crosby's PAT was blocked). Sanchez drove the Eagles 80 yards, hitting Jordan Matthews 10 yards for a touchdown, closing the gap to 39–13. Rodgers responded by hitting Lacy 32 yards for a touchdown on a screen pass. Sanchez threw his second interception of the night on the next possession, but Crosby missed a field goal. Once again Sanchez turned it over (this time on a fumble), and Casey Hayward returned it 49 yards for a touchdown, making the score a humiliating, 53–13. Sanchez hit Jeremy Maclin for a 20-yard touchdown pass on the next Eagle possession, to close the scoring, giving the Packers a 53–20 victory. The Packers outgained the Eagles 475–429, but four turnovers (all by Sanchez) buried the Eagles.

Week 12: vs. Tennessee Titans

This win marked the Eagles' first ever win against the Tennessee Titans, since they changed their name and city from the Houston Oilers. Also Josh Huff scored a 107-yard Touchdown on the opening kickoff

Week 13: at Dallas Cowboys
Thanksgiving Day game

With this win, the Eagles were not only the sole leaders of their division, but at 9–3, they tied the Broncos, Patriots, Cardinals, and Packers for the best record in the entire NFL.

Week 14: vs. Seattle Seahawks

The Eagles wore their blackout uniform in this game.

Week 15: vs. Dallas Cowboys

Week 16: at Washington Redskins

Even though the Redskins were 3–11 and had a 6-game losing streak, the Eagles lost to their divisional rivals due to a 4th quarter interception by Mark Sanchez. With the loss, the Eagles fell to 9–6, and were officially eliminated from postseason contention for the first time since 2012, after the Cowboys defeated the Colts the following Sunday.

Week 17: at New York Giants

With the win, the Eagles finished their season 10–6 and barely missed out on the playoffs.  The team also swept the Giants for the first time since 2010.

Standings

Division

Conference

References

External links
 

Philadelphia
Philadelphia Eagles seasons
Philadelphia Eagles